Nayam Vyakthamakkunnu (English: Making Your Stand Clear) is a 1991 Indian Malayalam film, directed by Balachandra Menon and produced by R. Mohan. The film stars Mammootty and Shanthi Krishna in the lead roles. The film has musical score by Johnson. the movie is based on the life of late Kerala Legislative assembly speaker G. Karthikeyan.

Plot
P. Sukumaran (Mammootty) is an upcoming youth wing leader of a minor party in the ruling coalition. His wife, Valsala (Shanthi Krishna) is a college lecturer and she takes care of family life which includes their school going son, Unni. She grows more and more tired of Sukumaran's lack of attention to her and family. Sukumaran is being taken advantage of by party leadership who burdens him with nasty tasks while his junior co-workers accept bribes in his name. They also invade the family's privacy and finance.

Sukumaran leads a picket in Secretariat and gets injured in a Police lathi charge. He also goes on a hunger strike for the party. When the hunger strike drags on for more than 5 days, Valsala storms the party meeting and forces the party leadership to end the hunger strike. Sukumaran borrowed money from multiple people who harass Valasala at college. Sukumaran also pawns most of Valsala's jewellery. Valsala also learns that Sukumaran hid her much awaited transfer order for selfish reasons. This prompts Valsala to leave Sukumaran for her parents' house.

As soon as Valsala leaves home, the news arrives that Sukumaran was appointed as the new minister. Sukumaran is sworn in as minister and enforces strict control over his personal staff, dismissing corrupt Kurudamannil Sasi (Jagadish) immediately. Sukumaran is further angered by a bogus newspaper interview of Valsala. Valsala visits the ministerial home, but Sukumaran refuses to meet her. Valsala leaves Sukumaran and takes charge in the new college.

Sukumaran misses Valsala. He visits places where he spent time with Valsala. The ministerial staff gets worried about his strange behavior. Valsala tries to send a letter to Sukumaran, but Sasi destroys the letter. The movie leads to tense climax as both husband and wife clash in public.

Cast
 
Mammootty... P. Sukumaran, a.k.a. P. S. 
Shanthi Krishna... Valsala Sukumaran, a.k.a. Vava
Jagadish... Kurudamannil Sasi
Adoor Bhavani... Bhageerathi Amma
Karamana Janardanan Nair 
A. C. Zainuddin... Gunman Sekhar
Sankaradi... Sankaranarayanan Thampi
Abi... Stephen
Kalabhavan Rahman
Janardanan... Chackochan
K.P.A.C. Sunny... Sadasivan
K. P. Ummer
V. K. Sreeraman
Kundara Johnny
Kaladi Omana
Lalitha Sree
K. B. Ganesh Kumar
Sulakshana
Thikkurissy Sukumaran Nair... Chief Minister of Kerala
Suchitra... Rosili
Valsala Menon... College Principal
Poojappura Radhakrishnan
Vishnu Ravee

Soundtrack
The music was composed by Johnson.

References

External links
  
 Nayam Vyakthamakkunnu on Pixslate 
 

1991 films
Films scored by Johnson
1990s Malayalam-language films
Films directed by Balachandra Menon